Aleksandrs Zerebkovs (born ) is a Latvian male weightlifter, competing in the 85 kg category and representing Latvia at international competitions. He participated at the 1992 Summer Olympics in the 75 kg event. He competed at world championships, most recently at the 1999 World Weightlifting Championships.

Major results

References

External links
 
 
 

1969 births
Living people
Latvian male weightlifters
Weightlifters at the 1992 Summer Olympics
Olympic weightlifters of Latvia
Sportspeople from Daugavpils
20th-century Latvian people